Netherlands at the European Road Championships is an overview of the Dutch results at the European Road Championships. The Netherlands hosted the European Road Championships twice. In 2006 in Valkenburg/Heerlen and in 2012 in Goes.

List of medalists

Most successful Dutch competitors

Medal table

Medals by year

Medals by discipline
updated after the 2014 European Road Championships

References

Results at the European Cycling Union website
Older results at:
Results men's RR U-23 (cyclingarchives)
Results men's ITT U-23 (cyclingarchives)
Results women's RR U-23 (cyclingarchives)
Results women's ITT U-23 (cyclingarchives)
Results men's RR Juniors (cyclingarchives)
Results men's ITT Juniors (cyclingarchives)
Results women's RR Juniors (cyclingarchives)
Results women's ITT Juniors (cyclingarchives)

See also

Other countries at the European Road Championships
 France at the European Road Championships
 Italy at the European Road Championships
 Sweden at the European Road Championships
 Ukraine at the European Road Championships
Netherlands at other cycling events
 Netherlands at the UCI Road World Championships
 Netherlands at the European Track Championships
 Netherlands at the UCI Track Cycling World Championships
 Netherlands at the UCI Track Cycling World Cup Classics

Netherlands at cycling events
Nations at the European Road Championships